Uzhla is a rural locality (a village) in Annenskoye Rural Settlement, Vytegorsky District, Vologda Oblast, Russia. The population was 112 as of 2002. There are 4 streets.

Geography 
Uzhla is located 70 km southeast of Vytegra (the district's administrative centre) by road. Annensky Most is the nearest rural locality.

References 

Rural localities in Vytegorsky District